Big Cub Geyser is a geyser in the Upper Geyser Basin of Yellowstone National Park in the United States.

Big Cub is part of the Lion's Group of geysers, a cluster of geysers that all share an underground connection. The other geysers in this group are Lion Geyser, Lioness Geyser, and Little Cub Geyser.

References 

Geysers of Wyoming
Geothermal features of Teton County, Wyoming
Geothermal features of Yellowstone National Park
Geysers of Teton County, Wyoming